Ectoedemia indicaevora is a moth of the family Nepticulidae. It was described by Scoble in 1983. It is known from Zimbabwe.

The larvae feed on Flacourtia indica.

References

Nepticulidae
Moths of Africa
Moths described in 1983
Taxa named by Malcolm Scoble